Torsten Voss (sometimes listed as Thorsten Voss; ; born 24 March 1963 in Güstrow, Mecklenburg-Vorpommern) is an East German-German track and field athlete and bobsledder who competed from the late 1980s to the late 1990s.

His biggest success was when he won the world title in the decathlon at the 1987 World Championships in Rome as a representative for East Germany.  He achieved a personal best score of 8680 points and was chosen as the East German sportsman of the year.  In 1988 in the Seoul Summer Olympic Games he won the silver medal behind fellow East German, Christian Schenk. His personal best of 8680 points ranks him fifth among German decathletes, behind Jürgen Hingsen, Uwe Freimuth, Siegfried Wentz and Frank Busemann.

In 1994 Voss switched to bobsleigh and was a pusher for Harald Czudaj and Wolfgang Hoppe. He won three medals in the four-man event at the FIBT World Championships with one silver (1997 with Dirk Wiese) and two bronzes (1995 with Czudaj, 1996 with Hoppe). Voss also finished eighth in the four-man event at the 1998 Winter Olympics in Nagano.

As a track and field athlete he was 1.86 meters tall and weighed 88 kilograms.

Other results in decathlon
1981 Junior-European championship: 2nd place
1982 Junior-World record: 8387 Points; East German champion
1983 World championship in Helsinki; East German champion
1987 East German champion
1990 East German champion
1993 (after a break for injury) Second place in the German championship (8037 points)

References

External links
 
 
 

1963 births
Living people
People from Güstrow
Athletes (track and field) at the 1988 Summer Olympics
Bobsledders at the 1998 Winter Olympics
East German decathletes
German male bobsledders
Olympic athletes of East Germany
Olympic silver medalists for East Germany
Olympic bobsledders of Germany
World Athletics Championships medalists
World Athletics Championships athletes for East Germany
Medalists at the 1988 Summer Olympics
Olympic silver medalists in athletics (track and field)
World Athletics Championships winners
Friendship Games medalists in athletics
Sportspeople from Mecklenburg-Western Pomerania